Barsanti is an Italian surname. Notable people with the surname include:

 Alessandro Barsanti (1858–1917), Italian architect and Egyptologist
 Eugenio Barsanti (1821–1864), Italian inventor of the internal combustion engine
 Francesco Barsanti (1690–1775), Italian flutist, oboist and composer
 Giorgio Barsanti (1918–1994), Italian football player
 Olinto M. Barsanti (1917–1973), commander of the 101st Airborne Division in Vietnam from 1967–1968
 Ottavio Barsanti (c.1826–1884), Italian Franciscan missionary in New Zealand

Italian-language surnames